Manuela Carosi (born 13 June 1965 in Rome) is a retired backstroke swimmer from Italy. She represented her native country at three consecutive Summer Olympics, starting in 1980. Carosi is a three-time gold medalist at the Mediterranean Games.

References

External links
 
 
 

1965 births
Living people
Swimmers from Rome
Italian female swimmers
Swimmers at the 1980 Summer Olympics
Swimmers at the 1984 Summer Olympics
Swimmers at the 1988 Summer Olympics
Olympic swimmers of Italy
European Aquatics Championships medalists in swimming
Mediterranean Games gold medalists for Italy
Swimmers at the 1983 Mediterranean Games
Swimmers at the 1987 Mediterranean Games
Mediterranean Games medalists in swimming
Italian female backstroke swimmers
Swimmers at the 1979 Mediterranean Games